Century City/Constellation Station is a planned heavy-rail subway station in the Los Angeles County Metro Rail system. It is part of the Purple Line Extension project, in Los Angeles, California. Construction started in 2018 as part of phase 2 of the extension project. It is slated to open in early 2025.

The station will include public art with works by Eddie Rodolfo Aparicio, Sarah Cain, Phùng Huynh, Oscar "Nimexica" Magallanes, and Analia Saban.

Attractions
 Westfield Century City Mall
 One Tower
 Constellation Place (formerly the MGM Tower) – Headquarters of Houlihan Lokey, ICM Partners, and International Lease Finance Corporation.
 John Paul Mitchell Systems headquarters
 Century Plaza Towers
 Fox Plaza Tower
 Fox Broadcasting Studios
 20th Century Studios
 Beverly Hills High School

References

External links
Transit Agency Information

Future Los Angeles Metro Rail stations
Railway stations scheduled to open in 2025